Héctor Sánchez may refer to:
Héctor Sánchez (footballer, born 1985), Spanish footballer
Héctor Sánchez (baseball) (born 1989), Venezuelan baseball player
Héctor Sánchez (footballer, born 1997), Bolivian footballer
Hector E. Sanchez, Mexican trade union leader

See also
Héctor Arenas Sánchez (born 1964), Mexican politician